Eilema similipuncta is a moth of the  subfamily Arctiinae. It is found in South Africa and
Zimbabwe.

The larvae feed on lichens.

References

Moths described in 1914
similipuncta
Lepidoptera of South Africa
Lepidoptera of Zimbabwe
Moths of Sub-Saharan Africa